Wyższa Szkoła Kupiecka can refer to two educational establishments:
 Wyższa Szkoła Kupiecka in Konin, Poland
 Wyższa Szkoła Kupiecka in Łódź, Poland